Events from the year 1644 in Sweden

Incumbents
 Monarch – Christina

Events

 9 January  - Battle of Kolding (1644)
 Swedish occupation of Jylland. 
 Swedish occupation of Landskrona and Helsingborg in Danish Scania.
 16 May - Action of 16 May 1644
 1 July - Battle of Colberger Heide
 13 October - Battle of Fehmarn (1644)
 23 November - Battle of Jüterbog
 Queen Christina is declared to be of legal majority and the regency government is dissolved.
 December 4 - Battle of Bysjön

 A new sumptuary law bans the use of textiles, laces and ribbons of gold and silver for clothing, as well as engagement- and baptism parties: the law is not respected and is replaced in 1664.

Births

 7 February - Nils Bielke, member of the High Council of Sweden, military and politician (died 1716) 
 Märet Jonsdotter, alleged witch (died 1672) 
 Beata Magdalena Wittenberg, courtier (died 1705)

Deaths

 26 July - Clas Fleming (admiral),  admiral and administrator involved in the development of a formal management structure for the Royal Swedish Navy under King Gustav II Adolf and Queen Christina (born 1592) 
 21 April - Torsten Stålhandske,  Finnish officer in the Swedish army during the Thirty Years' War (born 1593)

References

 
Years of the 17th century in Sweden
Sweden